Timofei Fyodorovich Osipovsky (February 2, 1766, Osipovo – June 24, 1832, Moscow) was a Russian Imperial mathematician, physicist, astronomer, and philosopher. Timofei Osipovsky graduated from the St Petersburg Teachers Seminary.

He became a teacher at Imperial Kharkov University, in 1805, the year it was founded. The city of Kharkov, thanks to its educational establishments, became one of the most important cultural and educational centres of Russian Empire. In 1813 he became rector of the University. However, in 1820, Osipovsky was suspended from his post on religious grounds.

Osipovsky's most famous work was the three volume book A Course of Mathematics (1801–1823). This soon became standard university text and was used in universities for many years.

References
 B. A. Rozenfeld, A History of Non-Euclidean Geometry : Evolution of the Concept of a Geometric Space (Springer, 1988).
 E. Ya. Bahmutskaya, Timofei Fedorovich Osipovsky and his 'Course of mathematics'  (Russian), Istor.-Mat. Issled. 5 (1952), 28–74.
 U. I. Frankfurt, "On the question of the critical analysis of Newton's teachings of space and time in the 18th century. From Leibniz to Lomonosov" (Russian), in Mechanics and physics in the second half of the 18th century (Russian) (Nauka, Moscow, 1978), 148–190.
 T. S. Polyakova, "Russian paternalistic traditions in mathematics education in the 18th century and the first half of the 19th century" (Russian), Istor.-Mat. Issled. (2) 5 (40) (2000), 174–191; 383.
 V. E. Prudnikov, "Supplementary information on T F Osipovsky" (Russian), Istor.-Mat. Issled. 5 (1952), 75–83.
 G. F. Rybkin, "Materialistic features of the Weltanschauung of M V Ostrogradskii and his teacher T F Osipovsky" (Russian), Uspekhi Matem. Nauk (N.S.) 7 2(48) (1952), 123–144.
 A. P. Yushkevich, "The French Revolution and the development of mathematics in Russia" (Russian), Priroda 1989 (7) (1989), 91–97.

External links

1766 births
1832 deaths
Russian mathematicians